Diceratobasis melanogaster is a species of damselfly in the family Coenagrionidae. It is endemic to the Dominican Republic.  Its natural habitat is subtropical or tropical moist lowland forests. It is threatened by habitat loss.

References

Sources

Coenagrionidae
Insects of the Dominican Republic
Endemic fauna of the Dominican Republic
Insects described in 1986
Taxonomy articles created by Polbot